Lili Ziedner (14 September 1885 – 10 February 1939) was a Swedish actress. She appeared in over twenty films between 1909 and 1939.

Selected filmography
 Mannekängen (1913)
 Norrtullsligan (1922)
 Uncle Frans (1926)
 Colourful Pages (1931)
 The Love Express (1932)
 Transit Camp (1932)
 A Stolen Waltz (1932)
 Eva Goes Aboard (1934)
 A Wedding Night at Stjarnehov (1934)
 Close Relations (1935)
 Kvartetten som sprängdes (1936)
 Hotel Paradise (1937)
 Herr Husassistenten (1939)
 The Two of Us (1939)

Further reading

External links
 

1885 births
1939 deaths
Swedish film actresses
Swedish silent film actresses
20th-century Swedish actresses
Actresses from Stockholm